Alan Victor Stewart (24 July 1922 – 24 July 2004) was an English professional footballer.

Stewart began his career with Huddersfield Town in 1946. He joined York City in 1949, where he was a part of the team which played in the FA Cup semi-final in 1955. He retired in 1957.

Notes

1922 births
Footballers from Newcastle upon Tyne
2004 deaths
Association football defenders
English footballers
English Football League players
Huddersfield Town A.F.C. players
York City F.C. players
Place of birth missing